Fanavid is a Brazilian glass manufacturer based in Guarulhos, São Paulo, Brazil.  Fanavid specializes in all types of auto glass.

History
Fanavid was founded in 1963 by Mansur Jose Farhat in São Paulo, Brazil, as an importer of glass.  In 1974 a tempered glass plant was founded in Village Guillermo.  In 1980 a curved laminated glass and plain glass plant was founded.  In 1992 a plant was opened in Dutra, with another opening there in 1995.  In 2002, all the operations of Fanavid are centered in the plant of Guarulhos.

External links
Fanavid Official Website (Portuguese)

Glassmaking companies
Manufacturing companies of Brazil
Companies based in São Paulo (state)
Manufacturing companies established in 1963
Brazilian brands